Rufus Reid (born February 10, 1944, in Atlanta, Georgia) is an American jazz bassist, educator, and composer.

Biography
Reid was raised in Sacramento, California, where he played the trumpet through junior high and high school. Upon graduation from Sacramento High School, he entered the United States Air Force as a trumpet player. During that period he began to be seriously interested in the bass.

After fulfilling his duties in the military, Rufus had decided he wanted to pursue a career as a professional bassist. He moved to Seattle, Washington, where he began serious study with James Harnett of the Seattle Symphony. He continued his education at Northwestern University in Evanston, Illinois, where he studied with Warren Benfield and principal bassist, Joseph Guastefeste, both of the Chicago Symphony. He graduated in 1971 with a Bachelor of Music Degree as a Performance Major on the Double Bass.

Rufus Reid's major professional career began in Chicago and continues since 1976 in New York City. Playing with hundreds of the world's greatest musicians, he is famously the bassist that saxophonist Dexter Gordon chose when he returned to the states from his decade-long exile in Denmark. His colleagues include Thad Jones, Nancy Wilson, Eddie Harris, and Bob Berg.

Reid has been a resident of Teaneck, New Jersey.

Discography

As leader
 Terrestrial Dance Rufus Reid Trio w/SIRIUS QUARTET  ( Newvelle Records - Vinyl only)
 Quiet Pride - The Elizabeth Catlett Project   ( Motéma Music )
 Hues of a Different Blue (Motéma)
 Out Front (Motéma)
 Live at the Kennedy Center (Motéma)
 The Gait Keeper (Sunnyside)
 Perpetual Stroll (Theresa)
 Seven Minds (Sunnyside)
 Corridor To The Limits (Sunnyside)
 Mirth Song, with Harold Danko (Sunnyside)
 Double Bass Delights, with Michael Moore (Double-Time)
 Intimacy of the Bass, with Michael Moore (Double-Time)
 Song for Luis, with Ron Jackson (Mastermix)
 Alone Together, with Peter Ind (Wave)

As TanaReid
With Akira Tana
 Yours and Mine (Concord Jazz, 1991)
 Passing Thoughts (Concord Jazz, 1992)
 Blue Motion (Paddle Wheel, 1993)
 Rumour with Charles Licata Rumour (Charles Publishing, 1995)
 Looking Forward (Evidence, 1995)
 Back to Front (Evidence, 1998)

As sideman

With Kenny Barron
Autumn in New York (Uptown, 1984)
The Moment (Reservoir, 1991)
Other Places (Verve, 1993)
Spirit Song (Verve, 1999)

With Jane Ira Bloom
 Art and Aviation (Arabesque, 1992)
The Nearness (Arabesque, 1996)

With Kenny Burrell
Listen to the Dawn (Muse, 1980 [1983])
Ellington a la Carte (Muse, 1983 [1993])
A la Carte (Muse, 1983 [1985])
Sunup to Sundown (Contemporary, 1991)

With Donald Byrd
Harlem Blues (Landmark, 1987)
A City Called Heaven (Landmark, 1991)

With George Cables
Circle (Contemporary, 1979 [1985])
A Letter to Dexter (Kind of Blue, 2006)

With Art Farmer
 Nostalgia (Baystate, 1983) with Benny Golson
 You Make Me Smile (Soul Note, 1984)
 Something to Live For: The Music of Billy Strayhorn (Contemporary, 1987)
 Blame It on My Youth (Contemporary, 1988)
 Ph.D. (Contemporary, 1989)

With Ricky Ford
Tenor for the Times (Muse, 1981)
Shorter Ideas (Muse, 1984)

With Frank Foster and Frank Wess
Two for the Blues (Pablo, 1984) 
Frankly Speaking (Concord, 1985)

With Stan Getz
 Anniversary! (EmArcy, 1987 [1989])
 Serenity (Emarcy, 1987 [1991])

With Dexter Gordon
 The Chase! (Prestige, 1970) with Gene Ammons
 Manhattan Symphonie (1978)

With Eddie Harris
 Instant Death (Atlantic, 1971)
 Eddie Harris Sings the Blues (Atlantic, 1972)
 Excursions (Atlantic, 1966–73)
 Is It In (Atlantic, 1973)
 I Need Some Money (Atlantic, 1974)
 Bad Luck Is All I Have (Atlantic, 1975)

With Andrew Hill
 Shades (1986)
 Eternal Spirit (1989)

With J. J. Johnson
 Quintergy (1988)
 Standards (1988)
 Let's Hang Out (1992)
 The Brass Orchestra (1996)
 Heroes (1998)

With Lee Konitz
 Figure & Spirit (Progressive, 1976)
 Ideal Scene (1986)

With Rob Schneiderman
 New Outlook (Reservoir, 1988)
 Smooth Sailing (Reservoir, 1990)

With The Thad Jones/ Mel Lewis Orchestra
 It Only Happens Every Time (1977)
The Thad Jones Mel Lewis Quartet (Artists House, 1978)With others' Roni Ben-Hur, Fortuna (2008)
 Jack DeJohnette, Album Album (ECM, 1984)
 Dan Faulk, Focusing In (Criss Cross Jazz, 1992)
 Benny Golson, Benny Golson Quartet (LRC Ltd. 1990)
 Barry Harris, For the Moment (Uptown, 1985)
 Jimmy Heath, New Picture (Landmark, 1985)
 Bobby Hutcherson, Cruisin' the 'Bird (Landmark, 1988)
 The Jazztet, Nostalgia (Baystate, 1983)
 Etta Jones, My Mother's Eyes (Muse, 1977)
 Frank Kimbrough, Monk's Dreams: The Complete Compositions of Thelonious Sphere Monk (Sunnyside, 2018)
 Kirk Lightsey, From Kirk to Nat (Criss Cross Jazz, 1991)
 Maulawi, Maulawi (Strata)
 Billy Mitchell, De Lawd's Blues (Xanadu, 1980)
 Tete Montoliu, A Spanish Treasure (Concord Jazz, 1991)
 Ralph Moore, Round Trip (Reservoir, 1985 [1987])
 Joe Newman and Joe Wilder, Hangin' Out (Concord Jazz, 1984) 
 Claudio Roditi, Claudio! (Uptown, 1985)
 Michel Sardaby, Going Places (Sound Hills, 1989)
 Jack Sheldon, Playing for Change (Uptown, 1986 [1997])
 John Stubblefield, Confessin' (Soul Note, 1984)
 Jon Irabagon, The Observer (2009)
 Geoff Keezer, Waiting In The Wings (Sunnyside, 1989)

Books
 The Evolving Bassist (1974)

Contributions to education
Jamey Aebersold Summer Jazz Workshops
Stanford Jazz Workshop
The Lake Placid Institute
Professor Emeritus, William Paterson University, Jazz Studies and Performance program (1979–1999)
The "Richard Davis Foundation for Young Bassists" Annual Bass Conference
The Sligo Jazz Project
Bass Coalition Summer Workshop

Awards and honors
 1997 Humanitarian Award, International Association for Jazz Education (IAJE)
 1998 Jazz Educator Achievement Award, Bass Player''
 1999 Outstanding Educator, New Jersey Chapter of the IAJE
 2001 Distinguished Achievement Award, International Society of Bassists
 2005 Mellon Jazz Living Legacy Award, Mid Atlantic Arts Foundation
 2006 Award, Raymond and Beverly Sackler Composition Competition, administered by University of Connecticut
 2006 Fellowship, New Jersey State Council on the Arts
 2006 ASCAP/IAJE Strayhorn Commission Recipient
 2008 Guggenheim Fellowship, Creative Arts/Music Composition category
 Charlie Parker Jazz Composition Award ("Skies Over Emilia")

References

External links
Official site
Stanford Jazz Workshop
Rufus Reid at Motéma Music
Rufus Reid Interview NAMM Oral History Program (2005)

1944 births
Living people
American jazz double-bassists
Male double-bassists
Musicians from Atlanta
People from Teaneck, New Jersey
Musicians from Sacramento, California
Jazz musicians from California
21st-century double-bassists
21st-century American male musicians
American male jazz musicians
The Jazztet members
Matteson-Phillips Tubajazz Consort members
Motéma Music artists
Atlantic Records artists
Concord Records artists
Sunnyside Records artists
Double-Time Records artists